Fayette County Airport  is a county-owned, public-use airport located at 2770 State Route 38 two nautical miles (3.7 km) northeast of the central business district of Washington Court House, a city in Fayette County, Ohio, United States.  According to the FAA's National Plan of Integrated Airport Systems for 2009–2013, it was classified as a general aviation airport.

Facilities and aircraft 
It has one runway designated 5/23 with an asphalt surface measuring 5,097 by 75 feet (1,554 x 23 m).

For the 12-month period ending May 28, 2009, the airport had 29,405 aircraft operations, an average of 80 per day: 97% general aviation, 2% air taxi, and 1% military.
At that time there were 21 aircraft based at this airport: 95% single-engine and 5% multi-engine.

Medical Helicopter Base 
In October 2013, it was announced that MedFlight, a not-for-profit, air and ground critical care transportation company based in Columbus, Ohio would establish a base at the airport. Operations commenced at the airport on December 6, 2013 with MedFlight leasing a hangar from a private party.

On May 1, 2014 the helicopter's base relocated to a permanent helipad on Old Route 35, near Octa.

References

External links 
 Aerial photo as of 24 April 1994 from USGS The National Map
 

Airports in Ohio
Buildings and structures in Fayette County, Ohio
Transportation in Fayette County, Ohio